Trimdon railway station served the village of Trimdon, County Durham, England, from 1871 to 1952 on the Great North of England, Clarence and Hartlepool Junction Railway.

History
The station was opened in August 1871 by the North Eastern Railway. To the north was the signal box and on the platform was the station building. It closed on 9 June 1952.

References

Disused railway stations in County Durham
Former North Eastern Railway (UK) stations
Railway stations in Great Britain opened in 1871
Railway stations in Great Britain closed in 1952
1871 establishments in England
1952 disestablishments in England